Borghetto di Borbera is a comune (municipality) in the Province of Alessandria in the Italian region Piedmont, located about  southeast of Turin and about  southeast of Alessandria.

Borghetto di Borbera borders the following municipalities: Cantalupo Ligure, Dernice, Garbagna, Grondona, Roccaforte Ligure, Sardigliano, Stazzano, and Vignole Borbera.

Main sights
In the town are the remainders of an old medieval castle, including a tower and a gate. The castle collapsed long time ago into the close by river bed due to water erosion and landslides. In the nearby village Torre Ratti is a well preserved castle from the 11th Century, which was enlarged and restored several times in the following centuries.

The new townhall was built in early 20th century as one of the first reinforced concrete buildings in Italy.

Twin towns — sister cities
Borghetto di Borbera is twinned with:

  Loreggia, Italy, since 2001

References

External links

Cities and towns in Piedmont